The 1962 U.S. Figure Skating Championships was held in Boston, Massachusetts from February 1 to 4, 1962. The compulsory figures and initial round dance events were held at the Skating Club of Boston rink, while the finals were held at the McHugh Forum rink at Boston College. Medals were awarded in three colors: gold (first), silver (second), and bronze (third) in four disciplines – men's singles, ladies' singles, pair skating, and ice dancing – across three levels: senior, junior, and novice.

The event determined the U.S. team for the 1962 World Championships.

It was the first national championship held following the deaths of the entire 1961 U.S. World Figure Skating team in the crash of Sabena Flight 548 near Brussels, Belgium on February 15, 1961. Not only were all of the 1961 champions dead, but so were the skaters who might have been expected to challenge them for the titles.

Senior results

Men
Monty Hoyt, the 1961 junior champion, won over 12-year-old Scott Ethan Allen. The junior men's free skating was considered the most exciting event of the entire competition, with Tommy Litz winning a split decision over Gary Visconti. Litz, Allen, and Visconti all went on to win the senior men's title in successive years.

Ladies
The ladies' event was won by 1960 Olympic bronze medalist Barbara Roles Pursley, who had been asked to come out of retirement; she had married and had a baby during the intervening year. She easily won the title with straight first-place ordinals after a poised and confident free skating performance that received an enthusiastic ovation from the crowd.

Pairs
The new champions were Dorothyann Nelson / Pieter Kollen, who pulled double duty and also won the silver in the dance event.

Ice dancing (Gold dance)
The dance event was won by the newly formed team of Yvonne Littlefield / Peter Betts.

Junior results

Men

Ladies

Pairs

Ice dancing (Silver dance)

* Eliminated before final round

Novice results

Men

Ladies

Sources
 "U.S. Championship Results", Skating magazine, March 1962
 "The United States Championships", Skating magazine, April 1962

U.S. Figure Skating Championships
United States Figure Skating Championships, 1962
United States Figure Skating Championships, 1962
United States Figure Skating Championships